South Los Angeles, also known as South Central Los Angeles or simply South Central, is a region in southwestern Los Angeles County, lying mostly within the city limits of Los Angeles, south of downtown.
It is "defined on Los Angeles city maps as a 16-square-mile rectangle with two prongs at the south end.” In 2003, the Los Angeles City Council renamed this area "South Los Angeles".

The name South Los Angeles can also refer to a larger 51-square mile region that includes areas within the city limits of Los Angeles as well as five unincorporated areas in the southern portion of Los Angeles County.

Geography

City of Los Angeles

The City of Los Angeles delineates the South Los Angeles Community Plan area as an area of 15.5 square miles. Adjacent communities include West Adams, Baldwin Hills, and Leimert Park to the west, and Southeast Los Angeles (the 26-neighborhood area east of the Harbor Freeway) on the east.

Los Angeles Times Mapping Project

According to the Los Angeles Times Mapping Project, the South Los Angeles region comprises 51 square miles, consisting of 25 neighborhoods within the City of Los Angeles as well as three unincorporated neighborhoods in the County of Los Angeles.

Google Maps

Google Maps delineates a similar area to the Los Angeles Times Mapping Project with notable differences on the western border. On the northwest, it omits a section of Los Angeles west of La Brea Avenue. On the southwest, it includes a section of the City of Inglewood north of Century Boulevard.

Districts and neighborhoods 
According to the Mapping L.A. survey of the Los Angeles Times, the South Los Angeles region consists of the following neighborhoods:

City of Los Angeles 

 Adams-Normandie
 Baldwin Hills/Crenshaw
 Broadway-Manchester
 Central-Alameda
 Chesterfield Square
 Exposition Park
 Florence
 Gramercy Park
 Green Meadows
 Harvard Park
 Historic South Central
 Hyde Park
 Jefferson Park
 Leimert Park
 Manchester Square
 Nevin
 South Park
 University Park
 Vermont Knolls
 Vermont Square
 Vermont Vista
 Vermont-Slauson
 Watts
 West Adams

Unincorporated County of Los Angeles Neighborhoods 

 Athens
 Florence-Firestone
 Westmont
 Willowbrook
 View Park-Windsor Hills

History

Pre-1948

In 1880, the University of Southern California, and in 1920, the Doheny Campus of Mount St. Mary's University, were founded in South Los Angeles. The 1932 and 1984 Olympic Games took place near the USC campus at neighboring Exposition Park, where the Los Angeles Coliseum is located.

Until the 1920s, the South Los Angeles neighborhood of West Adams was one of the most desirable areas of the City. As the wealthy were building stately mansions in West Adams and Jefferson Park, the White working class was establishing itself in Crenshaw and Hyde Park. Affluent blacks gradually moved into West Adams and Jefferson Park. As construction along the Wilshire Boulevard corridor gradually increased in the 1920s, the development of the city was drawn west of downtown and away from South Los Angeles.

In the eastern side of South Los Angeles (which the city calls the "Southeastern CPA") roughly east of the Harbor Freeway, the area grew southward in the late 1800s along the ever longer streetcar routes. Areas north of Slauson Boulevard were mostly built out by the late 1910s, while south of Slauson land was mostly undeveloped, much used by Chinese and Japanese Americans growing produce. In 1903, the farmers were bought out and Ascot Park racetrack was built, which turned into a "den of gambling and drinking". In the late 1910s the park was razed and freed up land for quick build-up of residential and industrial buildings in the 1920s.

"By 1940, approximately 70 percent of the black population of Los Angeles was confined to the Central Avenue corridor"; the area of modest bungalows and low-rise commercial buildings along Central Avenue emerged as the heart of the black community in southern California. Originally, the city's black community was concentrated around what is now Little Tokyo, but began moving south after 1900. It had one of the first jazz scenes in the western U.S., with trombonist Kid Ory a prominent resident. Under racially restrictive covenants, blacks were allowed to own property only within the "Slauson Box" (the area bounded by Main, Slauson, Alameda, and Washington) and in Watts, as well as in small enclaves elsewhere in the city. The working- and middle-class blacks who poured into Los Angeles during the Great Depression and in search of jobs during World War II found themselves penned into what was becoming a severely overcrowded neighborhood. During the war, blacks faced such dire housing shortages that the Housing Authority of the City of Los Angeles built the virtually all-black and Latino Pueblo Del Rio project, designed by Richard Neutra.

During this time, African Americans remained a minority alongside whites, Asians, and Hispanics; but by the 1930s those groups moved out of the area, African Americans continued to move in, and eastern South LA became majority black. Whites in previously established communities south of Slauson, east of Alameda and west of San Pedro streets persecuted blacks moving beyond established "lines", and thus blacks became effectively restricted to the area in between.

1948–1960s

When the Supreme Court banned the legal enforcement of race-oriented restrictive covenants in 1948's Shelley v. Kraemer, blacks began to move into areas outside the increasingly overcrowded Slauson-Alameda-Washington-Main settlement area. For a time in the early 1950s, southern Los Angeles became the site of significant racial violence, with whites bombing, firing into, and burning crosses on the lawns of homes purchased by black families south of Slauson. In an escalation of behavior that began in the 1920s, white gangs in nearby cities such as South Gate and Huntington Park routinely accosted blacks who traveled through white areas. The black mutual protection clubs that formed in response to these assaults became the basis of the region's street gangs.

As in most urban areas, 1950s freeway construction radically altered the geography of southern Los Angeles. Freeway routes tended to reinforce traditional segregation lines.

1970s–early 2000s

Beginning in the 1970s, the rapid decline of the area's manufacturing base resulted in a loss of the jobs that had allowed skilled union workers to enjoy a middle-class lifestyle. Downtown Los Angeles' service sector, which had long been dominated by unionized African Americans earning relatively fair wages, replaced most black workers with newly arrived Mexican and Central American immigrants.

Widespread unemployment, poverty and street crime contributed to the rise of street gangs in South Central, such as the Crips and the Bloods. The gangs became even more powerful with money coming in from drugs, especially the crack cocaine trade that was dominated by gangs in the 1980s.

Paul Feldman of the Los Angeles Times wrote in 1989:
Leaders of the black community regret the branding of a large, predominantly black sector of the city as South-Central, saying it amounts to a subtle form of racial stereotyping.
He added that they believed such "distinctive neighborhoods" as Leimert Park, Lafayette Square and the Crenshaw District were "well-removed" from South Central.

2000s–2010s

By the early 2010s, the crime rate of South Los Angeles had declined significantly. Redevelopment, improved police patrol, community-based peace programs, gang intervention work, and youth development organizations lowered the murder and crime rates to levels that had not been seen since the 1940s and 1950s. Nevertheless, South Los Angeles was still known for its gangs at the time. After leading the nation in homicides again in 2002, the City Council of Los Angeles voted to change the name South Central Los Angeles to South Los Angeles on all city documents in 2003, a move supporters said would "help erase a stigma that has dogged the southern part of the city."

On August 11, 2014, just two days after the shooting of Michael Brown in Ferguson, Missouri, a resident of South L.A., Ezell Ford, described as "a mentally ill 25-year-old man," was fatally shot by two Los Angeles police officers (see Shooting of Ezell Ford). Since then, a number of protests focused on events in Ferguson have taken place in South Los Angeles.

After the 2008 economic recession, housing prices in South Los Angeles recovered significantly, and by 2018, many had come to see South Los Angeles as a prime target for gentrification amid rising real estate values. Residents and activists are against market-rate housing as they have concerns that these projects will encourage landlords to sell, redevelop their properties or jack up rents. Under California law, cities can't reject residential projects based on these criticisms if the project complies with applicable planning and zoning rules. The construction of the K Line light rail through the neighborhood has stimulated the building of denser multistory projects, especially around the new stations. The NFL Stadium in Inglewood also encourages gentrification according to activists.

Real estate values in South Los Angeles were further bolstered by news that Los Angeles will host the 2028 Olympics, with many of the games to be hosted on or near the USC campus.

Demographics
By the end of the 1980s, South Los Angeles had an increasing number of Hispanics and Latinos, mostly in the northeastern section of the region.

According to scholars, "Between 1970 and 1990 the South LA area went from 80% African American and 9% Latino to 50.3% African American and 44% Latino." This massive and rapid residential demographic change occurred as resources in the area were shrinking due to global economic restructuring described above and due to the federal government's decrease in funding of urban anti-poverty and jobs programs, and other vital social services like healthcare. The socio-economic context described here increased the perception and the reality of competition amongst Asians, African Americans, and Latinos in South LA. The results from the 2000 census which show continuing demographic change coupled with recent economic trends indicating a deterioration of conditions in South LA suggest that such competition will not soon ease."

Many African Americans from South Los Angeles have moved to Palmdale and Lancaster in the Antelope Valley.

South Los Angeles has received immigrants from Mexico and Central America.

According to the city's "2014 South Los Angeles Community Plan Area Demographic Profile", South Los Angeles had a population of 271,040 residents with the following racial and ethnic balance:  

 Race:
 Asian - 4.9%
 White - 21.4%
 African-American - 28.7%
 Some Other Race -39.4%

 Ethnicity (Hispanic or Latino Origin by Race):
 Not Hispanic or Latino - 39%
 Hispanic or Latino - 61%

According to the census, for the category of "race", respondents self-identified as one of the following: White, African-American, American Indian/Alaska Native, Asian, Native Hawaiian/Pacific
Islander, Some Other Race, or Two or More Races. For the category of "ethnicity", they self-identified as either "Hispanic or Latino" or "Not Hispanic or Latino".

Education
South Los Angeles is home to the University of Southern California, a private research university in the University Park neighborhood. It is California's oldest private research university.

Los Angeles Unified School District
The following LAUSD schools fall within the boundaries of South Los Angeles.

LAUSD Elementary Schools
 Coliseum Street Elementary 
 Graham Elementary
 Grape Street Elementary
 Lovelia P. Flournoy Elementary
 Manchester Avenue Elementary
 Russell Elementary
 Foshay Learning Center
 20th Street Elementary
 28th Street Elementary
 68th Street Elementary
 75th Street Elementary
 107th Street Elementary
 109th Street Elementary
 112th Street Elementary
 116th Street Elementary
118th Street Elementary
Hooper Ave Elementary

LAUSD Middle Schools
 Audubon Middle School
 Carver Middle School
 Charles Drew Middle School
 Clinton Middle School
 Edwin Markham Middle School
 John Adams Middle School
 Mary McLeod Bethune Middle School
 Samuel Gompers Middle School
 Thomas Edison Middle School
 Los Angeles Academy Middle School
 Foshay Learning Center

LAUSD High Schools

Crenshaw High School
Susan Miller Dorsey High School
Locke High School
John C Fremont High School
 Thomas Jefferson High School
David Starr Jordan High School
 Diego Rivera Learning Complex
 King-Drew Senior High Medicine and Science Magnet
 Mervyn M Dymally Senior High
 Nathaniel Narbonne Senior High
 Santee Education Complex High School
 Foshay Learning Center
 Orthopaedic Hospital Medical Magnet High School

Colleges and Universities

Community Colleges
 Los Angeles Southwest College
 Los Angeles Trade Tech College

Universities
University of Southern California
Mount St. Mary's University (Los Angeles)

Landmarks

 Banc of California Stadium 
 California African American Museum
 California Science Center
 Central Avenue
 Clark Library
 Coca-Cola Building
 Dunbar Hotel
 Exposition Park
 Fire Station No. 30
 Leimert Park
 Lincoln Theater
 Los Angeles Memorial Coliseum
 Los Angeles Sports Arena (demolished)
 Lucas Museum of Narrative Art (under construction)
 King/Drew Medical Center
 Second Baptist Church
 28th Street YMCA
 University of Southern California
 Watts Towers

Notable people

Music and entertainment

A-K
 Ahmad Jones
 Barry White
 Brownside
 Blxst
 Charles Mingus
 Charles Wright & the Watts 103rd Street Rhythm Band
 CJ Mac
 Coolio
 Cozz
 Da Lench Mob
 Dom Kennedy
 Dr. Dre
 Eric Dolphy
 Glasses Malone
 Hakeem Khaaliq
 Hampton Hawes
 Ice Cube
 Issa Rae
 Jay Rock
 Jhené Aiko
 John Cage, musician
 Johnny "J"
 Kam
 K-Dee
 Kausion
 Keb' Mo'
 Kevin McCall
 Kurupt
 Kendrick Lamar

L-Z
 L.V.
 Meghan Markle
 Montell Jordan
 Murs
 Nipsey Hussle
 O.F.T.B.
 Patrice Rushen
 Ras Kass
 Robin Russell, drummer, member of New Birth/Nite-Liters (band)
 Schoolboy Q
 Scott Shaw
 Shawn Fonteno
 Sir Jinx
 Skee-Lo
 South Central Cartel
 Spider Loc
 Tiffany Haddish
 Tone Lōc
 Tyrese Gibson
 WC
 Young Maylay
 Etta James
 Ty Dolla $ign 
 Terrace Martin

Sports and athletes

 Andre Miller
 Baron Davis
 Darryl Strawberry
 Eddie Murray
 Eric Davis
 Florence Griffith-Joyner
 Ozzie Smith
 Russell Westbrook
 Steve Smith Sr.
 Trayvon Robinson
 Willie Mack
 DeSean Jackson

 Vontaze Burfict

Politicians

A-K
 Karen Bass, Mayor of Los Angeles 2022-present, State Assembly 2004–2010, U.S. House of Representatives, 2011–2022
 Tom Bradley (South Central, Los Angeles City Council, 1963–73; Mayor of the City of Los Angeles, 1973–93
 Yvonne Brathwaite Burke, State Assembly, 1967–73; U.S. House of Representatives, 1973–79; Los Angeles County Board of Supervisors, 1979–80 and 1992–2008 
 Julian C. Dixon, State Assembly, 1973–78; U.S. House of Representatives, 1979–2000
 Mervyn M. Dymally, State Assembly, 1962–68 and 2002–08; California State Senate, 1969–74; Lieutenant Governor of California, 1975–79; U.S. House of Representatives, 1981–93
 Robert C. Farrell (born 1936), journalist and member of the Los Angeles City Council, 1974–1991, prepared report on unemployment in Watts
 Augustus Hawkins, State Assembly, 1932–62; U.S. House of Representatives, 1962–1991
 Marqueece Harris-Dawson City Council, 2015–present)
 Horace Hiller (1844–1898), member of the Los Angeles Common Council
 Nate Holden, State Senator, 1974–78; Los Angeles City Council, 1987–2002

L-Z
 Gilbert Lindsey, Los Angeles City Council, 1962–91
 James G. McAllister, president of the South Los Angeles Property Owners' Protective League and City Council member
 Billy G. Mills, Los Angeles City Council, 1963–1974; Los Angeles Superior Court, 1974–??
 Holly Mitchell, State Assembly, 2010–present
 Kevin Murray, State Assembly, 1994–98; State Senate, 1998–2006
 Jan Perry, Los Angeles City Council, 2002–present
 Curren Price, City Council, 1993–97 and 2001–2006; State Assembly, 2006–2009; State Senate, 2009–present
 Mark Ridley-Thomas, Los Angeles City Council, 1991–2002; State Assembly; 2002–06; State Senate 2006–2008; Los Angeles County Board of Supervisors, 2008–present
 Frederick Madison Roberts, State Assembly, 1918–32
 Rita Walters, Los Angeles Unified School District Board, 1979–91; Los Angeles City Council, 1991–2001
 Maxine Waters, State Assembly, 1976–1991; U.S. House of Representatives, 1991–present
 Diane Watson, Los Angeles Unified School District Board, 1975–73; State Senate, 1978–98; United States Ambassador to Micronesia, 1999–2000; U.S. House of Representatives, 2001–2011
 Herb Wesson, State Assembly, 1998–2004; Los Angeles City Council, 2005–present)
 Roderick Wright, State Assembly, 1996–2002; State Senate, 2008–present)

Artists, filmmakers and writers

 Ron Finley (South LA)
 Mark Bradford (Leimert Park)
 Kody Scott (South LA)
 Catherine Opie (South LA)
 David Ayer (South LA)
 Charles Burnett (Watts)
 Wanda Coleman (Watts)
 John Singleton (South L.A.)
 Ava DuVernay (South L.A.)
 Issa Rae (South L.A.)
 Kehinde Wiley (South L.A.)

Education
 Rosemarie Allen (born 1950), American academic specialized in diversity, equity, and inclusion

Clergy
 Frederick K. C. Price (South Los Angeles)—founder and pastor of Crenshaw Christian Center

Government and infrastructure
The Los Angeles County Department of Health Services operates the South Health Center in Watts, Los Angeles, serving South Los Angeles.

See also

History of Mexican Americans in Los Angeles
Cholo (subculture)

References

Notes

Further reading
 Renwick, Lucille. "COVER STORY: THE MYTH OF South-Central: More a Stereotype Than a Place, It Is Defined By Ethnicity and Negative Media Images Rather Than Street Boundaries". Los Angeles Times. January 3, 1993.
 Kotkin, Joel (contributing editor of Opinion section) "COMMUNITY: Latinization of South Los Angeles" (Opinion). Los Angeles Times. May 28, 1995.

External links
 
 
 Image of the Vessels of Christ Ministry Choir in South Central Los Angeles, California, 1986. Los Angeles Times Photographic Archive (Collection 1429). UCLA Library Special Collections, Charles E. Young Research Library, University of California, Los Angeles.
 Image of South Central residents demonstrating against crime, Los Angeles, California, 1983. Los Angeles Times Photographic Archive (Collection 1429). UCLA Library Special Collections, Charles E. Young Research Library, University of California, Los Angeles.
 Black Experiences of Latinization and Loss in South Los Angeles

 
Los Angeles County, California regions
Chicano and Mexican neighborhoods in California
California Enterprise Zones
Neighborhoods in Los Angeles
African-American history in Los Angeles